Yves Donguy (born 1 January 1982 in Daloa, Côte d'Ivoire) is a rugby union player for Toulouse in the Top 14 competition. He plays on the wing.

He played in the Heineken Cup Final 2008.

He arrived in France at 6 years old. He started rugby in Bobigny, Seine-Saint-Denis (Partner club CA Brive).

Career
Until 2000 : AC Bobigny (Federal 1)
2000-2007 : CA Brive
Since 2007 : Stade Toulousain

Honours
Champion of France with the Stade Toulousain (2007–2008)
Champion of France with the Stade Toulousain (2010–2011)
Heineken Cup finalist with the Stade Toulousain (2007–2008)
Heineken Cup winner with the Stade toulousain (2009–2010)

References

External links
Toulouse profile

1982 births
Living people
French rugby union players
Stade Toulousain players
Rugby union wings
People from Daloa